Sacramento Surge were an American professional indoor soccer team based in Sacramento, California. They joined the Professional Arena Soccer League on September 7, 2012. Their colors are blue and gold. As of May 2014, the league is known as the Major Arena Soccer League.

The team played its 2012–13 season home matches at the Off The Wall Soccer Arena in Sacramento. For the 2013–14 season, they relocated to Estadio Azteca Soccer Arena, also in Sacramento. For the 2014–15 season, the team moved to a purpose-built arena at Jackson Sports Academy in McClellan Park.
For the 2015–16 season, the team then moved back to Estadio Azteca Soccer Arena.

Year-by-year

References

External links
Sacramento Surge official website

 
Major Arena Soccer League teams
Professional Arena Soccer League teams
2012 establishments in California
Indoor soccer clubs in the United States
Association football clubs established in 2012
2016 disestablishments in California
Association football clubs disestablished in 2016